John James Rimmer (born 10 February 1948) is an English former footballer who played as a goalkeeper in the Football League for Manchester United, Swansea City, Arsenal and Aston Villa.

Rimmer, who won two European Cup winners medals, has been described by the Birmingham Mail as "perhaps the greatest goalkeeper in Aston Villa's history".

Club career
Rimmer joined Manchester United as a schoolboy in 1963, turning professional two years later. He spent eleven years at Old Trafford, chiefly as Alex Stepney's understudy, including being on the bench in the 1968 European Cup Final. Rimmer only played 46 times for United and in October 1973 he was loaned to Swansea City. Arsenal signed him from United in February 1974, as a long-term replacement for Bob Wilson.

Rimmer made only one appearance in 1973–74, keeping a clean sheet on his debut against Liverpool. After Wilson's retirement at the end of that season, Rimmer became Arsenal's No. 1 for the next three seasons, and was a near ever-present for the Gunners, winning Arsenal's Player of The Year award in 1975. 

A year after Tottenham Hotspur manager Terry Neill took over at Arsenal, he signed Pat Jennings from his old club and Rimmer was sold to Aston Villa, having played 146 games for Arsenal. At Villa, Rimmer was No. 1 for the next six seasons, winning a First Division winners' medal in 1981. The following year Villa reached the European Cup final, but Rimmer was injured after only nine minutes and had to be replaced by Nigel Spink. Villa beat Bayern Munich 1–0, meaning Rimmer became the second player, after Saul Malatrasi, to win a European Cup winners' medal at two clubs.

Rimmer left Villa in 1983 to rejoin Swansea City.

International career
During his time at Arsenal, Rimmer also won his only England cap, against Italy in a friendly. Rimmer let two goals in and was substituted at half-time; England went on to recover and win 3–2.

Management and coaching
After retiring from playing, Rimmer became Swansea's goalkeeping coach, having a brief spell as manager following the sacking of Kevin Cullis, before being replaced by Jan Molby. He then spent several years in China as goalkeeping coach for their national team and Dalian Shide.

Personal life
Rimmer was born in Southport, Lancashire. 

After coaching in Canada, Rimmer retired from football and now lives in Swansea.

Honours
Manchester United
 European Cup: 1967–68

Aston Villa
 Football League First Division: 1980–81
 Charity Shield: 1981
European Cup: 1981–82
 European Super Cup: 1982

Individual
 Arsenal Player of the Season: 1974−75

References

1948 births
Living people
Footballers from Southport
English footballers
England international footballers
Association football goalkeepers
Manchester United F.C. players
Swansea City A.F.C. players
Arsenal F.C. players
Aston Villa F.C. players
English football managers
Ħamrun Spartans F.C. players
Swansea City A.F.C. managers
Luton Town F.C. players
UEFA Champions League winning players